Erik André Solbakken (born 30 August 1994) is a Norwegian competitive rower, born in Fredrikstad. He competed at the 2020 Summer Olympics in Tokyo 2021, in men's quadruple sculls.

References

External links
 
 
 

 

1994 births
Living people
People from Fredrikstad
Norwegian male rowers
Rowers at the 2020 Summer Olympics
Olympic rowers of Norway